Magnifico is a 2003 Filipino drama film written by Michiko Yamamoto and directed by Maryo J. de los Reyes. The film stars Jiro Manio, Lorna Tolentino, Albert Martinez, and Gloria Romero.

The film was released by Violett Film Productions and it received mixed-to-positive reviews from film critics and acclaim from various international film festivals.

Plot
In a Philippine village outside the island of Luzon, one special boy changes the lives of everyone he meets. Known to all as Magnifico, his nickname is Ikoy, a child of an impoverished family. His father works odd jobs, his elder brother (Miong) has lost his academic scholarship, and his mother spends her days caring for both Helen, a young daughter, who suffers from cerebral palsy, and for her husband's aging mother, who lives upstairs in the family home and has diabetes and pancreatic cancer. Magnifico is a sweet and well-intentioned boy, who is often berated by his father for his stupidity, an unkind assessment for a child who is considerably more clever than anyone gives him credit for.

Magnifico's world is filled with a cast of characters in need of his special gifts of hope, determination, and love. There's the grief-stricken man who mourns for his mother; two feuding shop owners; the crabby old woman who runs the mortuary; his elder brother, who has a crush on a wealthy girl; his little sister, who wants to get out and experience the world but cannot walk; and even his own ailing grandmother, who worries that the family won't be able to afford a proper burial for her when the time comes. That's a pretty tall order for just one boy.

Nonetheless, Magnifico applies himself diligently to the task, concocting a remedy for the mortician's ailments, playing matchmaker for his love-struck brother, industriously scheming to provide a burial gown and coffin for his grandmother, and negotiating a wheelchair so he can take his invalid sister to the carnival. Seeking nothing for himself, with his undaunted dedication to bringing joy to the people he loves, Magnifico somehow manages to find just the right solution to fill every need. And when the night of the big carnival arrives, his efforts pay off in spades.

Magnifico attempts to cross the street and instead gets fatally hit by a car one afternoon. Gerry, Edna, and Lola Magda mourn for their loss, and they rested him in the coffin he has originally crafted and intended for his grandmother. At his interment, Magnifico's family, friends, and the people he has touched were present as the community shared a tearful moment for his undying generosity.

Cast
Jiro Manio as Magnifico, the child protagonist
Lorna Tolentino as Edna, the mother of Magnifico
Albert Martinez as Gerry, the father of Magnifico
Gloria Romero as Lola Magda, the grandmother
Celia Rodriguez as Ka Doring, the mortician
Mark Gil as Domeng, the man whose mother dies
Tonton Gutierrez as Ka Romy, Gerry's boss and Isang's father
Amy Austria as Tessie, Cristy's enemy and a sari-sari store owner
Cherry Pie Picache as Cristy, a sari-sari store owner and Tessie's enemy
Danilo Barrios as Miong, Magnifico's older sibling
Susan Africa as Pracing, Carlo's mother
Isabella De Leon as Helen, Magnifico's younger sibling
Dindin Llarena as Ria, one of Magnifico's friends
Joseph Roble as Carlo, Magnifico's best friend
Girlie Sevilla as Isang, Miong's girlfriend
John Romano as Ria's Father
Dido De La Paz as Foreman
Allyson VII Gonzales as Makoy, Miong's peer
David Granado as Tessie's Husband
Scarlet as Teacher
Jojo Vinzon as the gay friend of Tessie
Dan De Guzman II as the teacher of Magnifico

Release
The film was first released in the Philippines on January 29, 2003. It was later given a release at the international film festivals including the Karlovy Vary International Film Festival in the Czech Republic on July 11, 2003 as one of its official entries; Fukuoka International Film Festival in Japan on September 13, 2003 under the Asian Panorama section; and Toronto International Film Festival in Canada on November 14, 2003.

Reception

Accolades
Magnifico gained international acclaim as an indie film in major international film festivals gaining 31 wins and 11 other nominations. It won the Crystal Bear for the 2004 Berlin International Film Festival Children's Category as well as the Deutsches Kinderhilfswerk Grand Prix. In the same year, it also garnered seven major awards in the FAMAS Awards, seven awards in the Gawad Urian Awards, seven awards in the Golden Screen Awards, and six awards in the FAP Awards in its home country. In 2011, the Gawad Urian Awards Committee proclaimed Magnifico as the "Best Film of the Decade".

Critical reception
On review aggregator website Rotten Tomatoes, the film holds an approval rating of 63% based on 8 reviews, with a weighted average of 6.53/10. At Metacritic, the film has a weighted average score of 53 out of 100, based on 6 critics, indicating "mixed or average reviews".

Time Out called the film an "undistinguished gentle comedy that turns into an astoundingly saccharin melodrama".

On a review from the New York Post, despite giving criticism to the director and writer for giving various emotions to the audience, it was praised for its "well-made" story as well as the acting performances of the film's lead actors, particularly Jiro Manio. 

Ferdinand Lapuz of Metro said that "Magnifico is one of those films in which a decent soul struggles against enormous odds to bring some comfort to the people he loves. It's a melodrama, but it's honest about it".

References

External links

2003 drama films
2000s Tagalog-language films
Philippine drama films
Films directed by Maryo J. de los Reyes